Sishu Bholanath (English: 'The Child Bholanath') is a Bengali book of poems written by Rabindranath Tagore. It was published in 1922. It consists of 27 poems. It is a famous work of Tagore for the children.

Theme 
The desire, imagination and courage of child is the main theme of the book. The poems are rhythmic and enriched with the thoughts of greatness. Most of the poems are written addressing a silent mother. The natural object is also an integral part of the book.

List of poems 
The poems of "Sishu Bholanath" are:

 Sishu bholanath
 Buri
 Mone para
 Sat samudra pare
 Pathhara
 Dur
 Ichhamati
 Rajmishtri
 Martabasi
 Sishur jibon
 Robibar
 Putul bhanga
 Jyotishi
 Sanshajee
 Baul
 Anyo maa
 Ghumer tatva
 Bani-binimoy
Talgach
 Somoyhara
 Murkhu
 Khela-bhola
 Raja o rani
 Dustu
 Duyorani
 Dui ami
 Bristi roudra
 bad boy

References 

1922 poetry books
Bengali poetry collections
Poetry collections by Rabindranath Tagore